Hassan Niazi may refer to:

 Hassan Niazi (fencer), an Egyptian fencer
 Hassan Niazi (actor), a Pakistani actor
 Hassan Niazi (lawyer), a Pakistani lawyer and the nephew of Imran Khan